The Worshipful Company of Spectacle Makers is one of the Livery Companies of the City of London, UK.

The company was founded by a Royal Charter of Charles I in 1629 AD; it was granted the status of a Livery Company in 1809. The company was empowered to set regulations and standards for optical devices; this was eroded by the Industrial Revolution, after which mechanical advancements made trade restrictions difficult to enforce.

F.S.M.C. credential
The company acquired the right, however, to set examinations that opticians had to pass before practising. The opticians that passed the examinations were designated F.S.M.C. and this credential stood for Fellowship in Optometry of the Worshipful Company of Spectacle Makers.

British College of Ophthalmic Opticians
This power was surrendered to the British College of Ophthalmic Opticians (now titled the College of Optometrists) in 1979, who took over the examination of optometrists, and in 1986 power of examination for dispensing opticians was surrendered to the Association of British Dispensing Opticians (ABDO).

Association of British Dispensing Opticians
In 1986, the power of examination for dispensing opticians was surrendered to the Association of British Dispensing Opticians (ABDO).
Now, the Spectacle Makers' Company supports charities, including Vision Aid Overseas, and research in the field of optics and conducts training and professional development including the two-year correspondence course for optical technicians that has national accreditation in the British National Qualifications Framework.
	
The Spectacle Makers' Company ranks sixtieth in the order of precedence for Livery Companies.

References

External links
 The Spectacle Makers' Company
 College of Optometrists
 Association of British Dispensing Opticians

 
Eye care in the United Kingdom
Spectacle Makers
1629 establishments in England